Kose Dam is a gravity dam located in Nara prefecture in Japan. The dam is used for power production. The catchment area of the dam is 30.6 km2. The dam impounds about 8  ha of land when full and can store 476 thousand cubic meters of water. The construction of the dam was started in 1938 and completed in 1940.

References

Dams in Nara Prefecture
1940 establishments in Japan